Račkauskas is a Lithuanian language family name. It corresponds to Polish surname Raczkowski and Russian Rachkovsky/Rachkovski.

The surname may refer to:
Andrius Račkauskas, Lithuanian handball player
Arimantas Račkauskas, mayor of Kaunas, 1992–1995

Lithuanian-language surnames